Nyctimystes zweifeli, or Zweifel's big-eyed tree frog, is a species of frog in the subfamily Pelodryadinae endemic to Papua New Guinea. Its natural habitats are subtropical or tropical moist montane forests and rivers.

References

zweifeli
Amphibians of Papua New Guinea
Amphibians described in 1967
Taxonomy articles created by Polbot